The Southern Yorke Peninsula Important Bird Area is a  tract of land consisting of most of the south-western tip of the Yorke Peninsula in South Australia about  west of Adelaide.

Description
The Important Bird Area (IBA) includes most of the south-western tip of Yorke Peninsula including land protected by statute, privately owned or declared as crown land and which usually has natural habitat. Outside this area, most of the Yorke Peninsula's native vegetation has been cleared for grazing and cropping. The land in the IBA is an undulating plain, bordered by coastal cliffs, with calcareous sands and loams forming dunes over limestone bedrock. Habitats include intertidal ecosystems, beaches, heathlands, mallee woodlands and salt lakes.

Criteria for nomination as an IBA
The site has been identified by BirdLife International as an IBA because it supports populations of malleefowl, fairy terns, western whipbirds, rock parrots and purple-gaped honeyeaters.

Associated protected areas
While the IBA has no statutory status, it does overlap the following protected areas declared by the South Australian government: Innes National Park and Warrenben Conservation Park.

See also
List of birds of South Australia

References

Important Bird Areas of South Australia
Yorke Peninsula